Muradiye is a town (belde) in the Rize District, Rize Province, Turkey. Its population is 2,571 (2021).

References

Populated places in Rize District